Main Street is the generic street name (and often the official name) of the primary retail street of a village, town, or small city in many parts of the world.

Main Street, MainStreet, or Mainstreet may refer to:

Places

Canada
Main Street (Toronto, Ontario)
Main Street (Hamilton, Ontario)
Main Street Unionville, Ontario
Main Street (Vancouver), British Columbia
Winnipeg Route 52, Main Street in Winnipeg, Manitoba
Niagara Regional Road 81, Main Street in Grimsby, Ontario
York Regional Road 68, Main Street in the old village of Markham, Ontario
York Regional Road 76, Main Street in Schomberg, Ontario
Peel Regional Road 136, Main street in Alton, Ontario

Ireland
Main Street, Letterkenny, Longest street in Ireland

United States

 U.S. Route 40, referred to as "Main Street of America" pre-WWII and post creation of the US route system
 U.S. Route 66, referred to as "Main Street of America" post-WWII and pre-Interstate network completion
 Pennsylvania Avenue, specifically the portion stretching from the White House to the United States Capitol, known as "America's Main Street"

By state, then city:
 Main Street (Los Angeles), California
 Main Street (Santa Monica, California)
 Main Street (Mackinac Island, Michigan)
 Main Street (Kansas City, Missouri)
 Nevada State Route 601, Main Street in Las Vegas, Nevada
 Montauk Highway, Main Street in parts of Suffolk County, New York
 Main Street (Queens), New York
 Main Street District, Dallas, Texas
 Main Street (Greater Salt Lake City), Utah

Gibraltar
Main Street, Gibraltar

Music
MainStreet (band), a Dutch boy band
Main Street (quartet), an American barbershop quartet
Main Street (Roy Wood & Wizzard album), an album by the British rock band Wizzard
Main Street (Epicure album), an album by the Australian rock band Epicure
"Mainstreet" (song), a song by Bob Seger

Other
Main Street America, a national organization that works to revitalize historic downtowns in the United States
Mainstreet Bank Limited, A commercial bank in Nigeria
Main Street (Dreamworld), part of the Dreamworld theme park
MainStreet (department store), defunct American department store chain
Main Street (novel), a satirical novel by Sinclair Lewis
Main Street (1923 film), an American film based on the book
Calle Mayor (film), a 1956 Spanish film released in English-speaking countries as Main Street
Main Street (2010 film), an American film starring Orlando Bloom
Main Street (novel series), a children's novel series by Ann M. Martin
Main Street Complex, a retail and office complex in Voorhees, New Jersey
Mainstreet Theater, a landmark building in Kansas City, Missouri
 Main Street, U.S.A., part of each Walt Disney theme park
Performance MainStreet, also known as just Mainstreet, a defunct UK satellite TV channel
Small business, in contrast to "Wall Street" for big business

See also
Main Street Station (disambiguation)
High Street (disambiguation), an alternative equivalent of Main Street in England and some other parts of the world (e.g. Hong Kong)